Jacobaea insubrica is a species of plant in the genus Jacobaea and the family Asteraceae. It is native to Italy and Switzerland. It was described as a new combination in 2015 by Galasso and Bartolucci.

References

insubrica